INS Jyoti (A58) (meaning: sacred light) is the third of the four Komandarm Fedko-class replenishment oilers. She was modified for naval use and is now being operated by the Eastern Naval Command of the Indian Navy. Jyoti was the largest ship in the navy until INS Vikramaditya (R33) was commissioned in November 2013. Its primary role is fleet replenishment and sustaining blue-water operations. It was later fitted with close-in weapon systems for self-defence.

It is a major force multiplier in sustaining the navy's blue water operations. It can increase the range of a naval task force without tanker support from seven days and 2400 nautical miles to 50 days and 16,800 nautical miles.

Design and description

General characteristics and propulsion 
The complement is about 208, including 23 officers.

The ship is powered by a Bryansk–Burmeister & Wain 6DKRN60/195 diesel (a licence-built MAN-B&W 6L60MC) delivering  to a single fixed pitch propeller.

Capacity
Displacing 39,900 tons at full load, Jyoti is the second largest ship of the navy, even larger than the decommissioned 28,500 tons aircraft carrier INS Viraat. The ship can carry 28,000 tons at full load, consisting of fuel diesel, aviation fuels, oils, and water of different grades. The fresh water carried for use in steam turbines is of much higher grade than drinking water.

Jyoti has two replenishment positions on each side, with the option of stern refueling and can replenish three ships simultaneously. It can refuel at the rate of 300 tonnes per hour. It has a range of 12,000 nautical miles at the top speed of 15 knots. It has a double-skin hull, which prevents sea pollution in case of damage to any fuel tank, and carries eco-friendly equipment on board to prevent marine and environmental pollution. The space between the double-hull is used for ballast tanks. The fuel and water levels in the cargo tanks are checked to maintain the ship's stability during loading and discharging of supplies.

Armament
It was initially armed with light and medium machine guns. In 2000, self-defence capability was added by installing new close-in weapons like anti-aircraft and anti-missile guns and missiles. This was done to enhance the survivability of the ship during surface warfare operations on India's western seaboard. It also has a helicopter deck.

Procurement and service

INS Jyoti was constructed by the Admiralty Shipyard of St. Petersburg, Russia. It was built to be a Project 15966M merchant tanker, but was modified and purchased by the Indian Navy, and was commissioned on 20 July 1996.

Service history

1998
Growth in the India-Philippines relations broadened ways for the cooperation between navies. Three Indian naval ships - ,  and INS Jyoti visited the Philippines from 24–27 October 1998.

On 28 March 1998, four civilian workmen were killed in a gas explosion on-board Jyoti at the naval dockyard.

2001
The ships made port calls at Fremantle, Sydney, Wellington and Ho Chi Minh City.

2003
INS Jyoti visited the Shanghai naval base in 2003 as part of a three-vessel fleet, for a five-day official visit. The fleet was commanded by flag officer Rear Admiral R. P. Suthan of India's Eastern Naval Command. It comprised a guided missile destroyer , a guided missile corvette  and Jyoti. The fleet held airborne and surface search and rescue exercises with China's East Sea Fleet, which were code-named Dolphin 0311. Before the joint exercise, the Chinese and Indian ships also conducted maritime communication and formation maneuvers. These were the first joint naval exercises between China and India. The fleet left Shanghai on 14 November 2003.

2007
In early 2007, a fleet of ships from the navy's Eastern command conducted a two-month-long deployment in the South-East and East Asia. The ships, guided-missile destroyers , INS Rana and INS Ranjit, the guided-missile corvette, INS Kuthar and the fleet tanker INS Jyoti, were under the command of Flag Officer Commanding Eastern Fleet, Rear Admiral R K Dhowan. From 18 March to 23 May, the fleet made port-calls at a number of ports, including Singapore, Yokosuka in Japan, Qingdao located on the southern coast of the Shandong peninsula of China, Ho Chi Minh City in Vietnam, and Vladivostok in Russia. The fleet left Qingdao on 16 April 2007, and then conducted joint anti-terror exercises with the Russian Navy.

During September 2007, the navy deployed three ships - , INS Beas and INS Jyoti on a four-day goodwill mission to Oman, to strengthen maritime relations and develop maritime cooperation. The deployment was led by Rear Admiral Shekhar Sinha, Flag Officer Commanding of Western Naval Command.

2009

In 2009, Jyoti, along with INS Mumbai, INS Ranvir and INS Khanjar took part in an international fleet review at Qingdao, conducted by the China's People's Liberation Army Navy (PLAN) on its 60th anniversary. Twenty one naval vessels from 14 nations and delegations from 29 countries took part in the review, which lasted from 20 to 24 April. The fleet then proceeded to Okinawa in Japan, and took part in Malabar 2010 with the US Navy's Seventh fleet and the Japanese Maritime Self-Defense Force. The exercise involved air defence, anti-submarine and surface warfare.

2010
By 2010, the ship had completed thirteen years in the navy, during which it had undertaken 2504 underway replenishment runs and travelled 375,282 nautical miles. It had operated in the Indian Ocean, South China Sea, Red Sea, Persian Gulf and the Pacific Ocean and has participated in numerous multinational exercises with the navies of United States of America, South Korea, Philippines, Japan and Singapore etc.

In April 2010, it took part in the 17th Singapore-Indian Maritime Bilateral Exercise (SIMBEX) with the Singapore Navy. SIMBEX-2010 was held in the Andaman Sea and the Bay of Bengal. During the exercise, Jyoti simultaneously refueled INS Ranvir and RSS Intrepid. The fleet later called at Port Blair and Visakhapatnam.

In May 2010, the navy’s Eastern Fleet deployed INS Jyoti, along with guided-missile destroyers INS Rana and INS Ranjit and missile corvette INS Kulish from Port Blair to South East Asia, where the fleet undertook passage exercises with the navies of Indonesia, Singapore and Australia. Jyoti was under the command of Captain A Venugopal NM and carried a complement of 19 officers and 170 sailors. The fleet sailed under the command of Flag Officer Commanding, Eastern Fleet, Rear Admiral P N Murugesan and made port calls at Jakarta (Indonesia), Hai Phong (Vietnam), Manila (Philippines), Muara (Brunei), Bangkok (Thailand), Fremantle (Australia), Singapore and Port Kelang (Malaysia). At Port Kelang, the fleet conducted anti-piracy exercises with the Malaysian Navy from 20 to 23 June, and left port on 23 June.

2011

In early 2011, the ship was part of a fleet of warships from the Eastern Fleet which went on an operational deployment in South East Asia and Western Pacific. They were commanded by Rear Admiral Harish Chandra Singh Bisht. The flotilla, along with an Indian Navy maritime reconnaissance aircraft took part in a five-day exercise SIMBEX 2011 with the Singapore navy in the South China Sea. Four naval ships including a submarine of the Singapore Navy were commanded by Rear Admiral Joseph Leong, Fleet Commander of the Republic of Singapore Navy. The Indian fleet then proceeded on its forward deployment, and made port calls at Alava pier in Subic Bay (Philippines), Vlapostok (Russia), Manila (Philippines), Ho Chi Minh City (Vietnam), Bandar Sera Begawan (Brunei), Kota Kina Balu (Malaysia) and Jakarta (Indonesia). The ships also visited China, Japan and South Korea. After exercising with the U.S. Navy, the fleet conducted drills at Vladivostok, with the Russian Navy's Pacific Fleet. This was the second time the Indian Navy had made a port call at Vladivostok.

From 2–10 April, the ship, as part of the flotilla took part in the Malabar 2011 exercise with the U.S. Navy's 7th Fleet.

In May 2011, Jyoti and Ranvir, led by Captain Sunil Balakrishnan, were deployed to Brunei, and docked at Muara port. The purpose of the visit was to build on cultural and diplomatic relations between the two countries.

See also

References

External links

 INS Jyoti refueling two frigates at sea during SIMBEX 2011
 INS Jyoti in Malabar 2011
 The tanker INS Jyoti

1995 ships
Tankers of the Indian Navy